

Events
troubadour Obs de Biguli entertains at the coronation of the Emperor Frederick II
Uc de Saint Circ moves first into Provence, then Lombardy, and finally the March of Treviso; in Italy he composes many vidas and razos
Bertran Folcon d'Avignon and Gui de Cavalhon exchange coblas about the siege of Castelnaudary

Births
 Brunetto Latini (died 1294), Florentine philosopher, poet, scholar and statesman

Deaths
 Wolfram von Eschenbach (born 1170), German knight and poet; as a Minnesinger, he also wrote lyric poetry
 Heinrich von Morungen died 1220 or 1222 (born unknown), a German Minnesänger

See also

Poetry
 List of years in poetry

13th-century poetry
Poetry